Jilemnický okultista (English title: The Jilemnice Occultist) is the second studio album by Czech black metal band Master's Hammer, self-released on December 1992 and distributed elsewhere by Osmose Productions in the following year. Self-described by the band as "the world's first black metal operetta" and largely inspired by King Diamond's rock operas (an early influence of Master's Hammer alongside another project fronted by their eponymous vocalist, Mercyful Fate), it is their first of two concept albums, the second being Vagus Vetus, released in 2014. On several early Osmose pressings "Jilemnice" is misspelt as "Filemnice", what would be corrected in later pressings. Despite the track listing being in English, all the lyrics are in Czech. The original release contained the Czech titles.

In this album, Vlastimil Voral joined Master's Hammer as a full-time member (he had already played on the band's previous album, Ritual., but was credited as a guest musician only).

Jilemnický okultista would be re-issued in 2017 by Franta Štorm's label Jihosound Records under digipak format with a slightly different cover art and two bonus tracks, taken from a preliminary demo tape version of the album recorded in early February 1992 (see below).

Plot
The album, which is meant to be read as an "operetta in three acts", is set in Bohemia, in the year of 1913, and tells the story of Atrament, a young wandering occultist who just arrives in the village of Jilemnice with the intent of furthering his studies on the occult arts there (since at the time the village was a major venue for occultists and Spiritist mediums). He settles at an inn ran by the rich landlord Spiritus, and falls in love at first sight with his beautiful daughter, Kalamaria (who is secretly a witch), being requited. However, the village's hejtman (captain), Satrapold, also loves Kalamaria. After injustly arresting Atrament, he kidnaps Kalamaria with the help of his groom Blether and takes her to his castle. Satrapold plans to escape to Cairo with her (betraying Blether in the process, who flees to the nearby town of Železný Brod in disgrace, never to be seen or heard from again), but before he can do so she uses her mystical powers to discover that he is actually the villainous Poebeldorf under disguise, and that he also imprisoned the real Satrapold. Formerly Satrapold's aide-de-camp, Poebeldorf rebelled against his master and planned all along to take his place as the village's captain, steal all its riches and Kalamaria's fortune, and flee to start a new life in a different land, but Kalamaria thwarts his evil plans thanks to her powers; subsequently, both Atrament and Satrapold are freed from prison and Poebeldorf himself is arrested. The album then ends with a huge celebration taking place at Spiritus' inn.

The only track unrelated to the album's story is "Suchardův dům (V Nové Pace)". Suchardův dům, or "Sucharda's house" in English, was the residence of the noble Sucharda family of woodcarvers and sculptors from Nová Paka, originally built in 1896. Since 1908 the City Museum of Nová Paka functions in the house. Notable members of the Sucharda family include brothers Stanislav and Vojtěch Sucharda.

Covers
German gothic metal band The Vision Bleak made an English-language adaptation of "Já mizérií osudu jsem pronásledován..." (under the title "By the Misery of Fate He Was Haunted"), present in the digipak re-release of their 2010 album Set Sail to Mystery.

Critical reception
Götz Kühnemund from German Rock Hard magazine compared Jilemnický okultista to King Diamond, though Master's Hammer's style was described as "considerably more uncompromising". The vocals were described as "like a mixture of deep King Diamond voices and Quorthon's guttural grunts". Kühnemund lauded the band's unusual style and the album's "[u]nexpectedly good" production that "never lets faster chipping passages degenerate into awful chaos". He called Jilemnický okultista "one of the most extraordinary death metal albums of the year". Gabe Kagan, writing for Invisible Blog, also spoke favorably of the album, calling it "the soundtrack to the literary works of E. T. A. Hoffmann".

In 2017, the album was featured in Loudwire list of the Top 30 Black Metal Albums of All Time, in 27th place.

Track listing

Jilemnický okultista demo
The Jilemnický okultista demo tape, self-released in February 1992, contains a slightly different track listing, and was recorded on an Apple Macintosh IIci, a novelty in the Czech Republic at the time. The demo counterparts of "Mezi kopci cesta je klikatá..." and "Já nechci mnoho trápiti..." previously appeared on the band's teaser EP Klavierstück, which came out the year prior, under the English titles "Cards Do Not Lie" and "Satrapold" respectively.

Famous Czech guitarist Vítek "Vít" Malinovský was a guest musician on the tape, contributing with guitar solos for the instrumental tracks "Litografické kalendáře" and "Mediální kresby".

Jilemnický okultista was eventually remastered in 2013 for the release of Demos., a compilation of all of Master's Hammer's demo tapes.

Personnel
 František "Franta" Štorm – vocals, guitars, photography, cover art, production
 Tomáš "Necrocock" Kohout – guitars
 Tomáš "Monster" Vendl – bass
 Miroslav "Mirek" Valenta – drums
 Honza "Silenthell" Přibyl – timpani
 Vlastimil "Vlasta" Voral – keyboards, production, engineering, mixing

References

1992 albums
Concept albums
Master's Hammer albums
Self-released albums
Osmose Productions albums
Rock operas